Phaeomolis curvenal is a moth of the family Erebidae first described by William Schaus in 1933. It is found in Colombia.

References

Phaegopterina
Moths described in 1933